Pygmodeon buscki is a species of beetle in the family Cerambycidae. It was described by Linsley in 1935.

References

Neoibidionini
Beetles described in 1935